Centru (Romanian for centre) is the main cultural, financial, administrative and commercial area in Cluj-Napoca in Romania. The centre consists of three main squares, the Piaţa Unirii, Piaţa Mihai Viteazul and Piaţa Avram Iancu. It also contains a number of smaller plazas.

Districts of Cluj-Napoca